Clelia Haji-Ioannou (born 1970/1971) is a Cypriot billionaire, due to her shareholding in EasyJet, the airline founded by her brother Stelios Haji-Ioannou.

Clelia Haji-Ioannou is the daughter of Loucas Haji-Ioannou.

Haji-Ioannou owns in excess of $40 million in property, "mostly in Monaco, Cyprus, Athens and London".

She is divorced, with two children, and lives in Monte Carlo, Monaco.

References

1970s births
Living people
Cypriot billionaires
Greek Cypriot people
Cypriot expatriates in Monaco
Female billionaires
Clelia